Denham Arthur Kelsey (born October 9, 1961) is a Virginia lawyer and justice of the Supreme Court of Virginia. His twelve-year term on the Supreme Court began on February 1, 2015.   Kelsey was previously a judge of the Court of Appeals of Virginia.

Biography
Kelsey was born in Norfolk, Virginia. He graduated magna cum laude from Old Dominion University in 1982 and obtained his law degree from the College of William & Mary in 1985, as a member of the Order of the Coif.  He then clerked for the Honorable John Ashton MacKenzie, United States District Judge for the Eastern District of Virginia.

After several years in private practice, including as a litigation partner at Hunton & Williams, Kelsey was elected to be a circuit judge for the Fifth Judicial District of Virginia, based in Suffolk, in 2000. He was appointed by Governor Mark R. Warner to the Virginia Court of Appeals in August 2002, to fill a vacancy created by the retirement of Judge Robert S. Bray. He was subsequently elected by the General Assembly for an eight-year term in 2003 and re-elected in 2011.

Kelsey previously sought election to the Supreme Court in 2008 (to fill the vacancy created when former Justice G. Steven Agee resigned upon his appointment to the United States Court of Appeals for the Fourth Circuit), and in 2011 (to fill the vacancy created when Senior Justice Lawrence Koontz retired). He was originally the only candidate under consideration to fill the vacancy created by the retirement of former Justice Cynthia D. Kinser in 2015, but his candidacy suffered a temporary setback when Republican members of the state Senate objected to the lack of choice for the Kinser seat and two vacancies on the Court of Appeals.  The Senate delayed the election to interview additional candidates to fill the vacancies. It ultimately agreed with the House of Delegates and the General Assembly unanimously elected Kelsey to the Supreme Court on January 20, 2015, for a twelve-year term beginning the following February 1.
Kelsey serves as an adjunct professor at the Marshall-Wythe School of Law, College of William & Mary, Regent University School of Law, and Appalachian School of Law.

Publications

•  Bracton’s Warning & Hamilton’s Reassurance, 66 Virginia Lawyer 2, at 20 (2017), and Response to Letter to Editor, 66 Virginia Lawyer 3, at 6, 8 (2017)

•  The Laws of Physics and the Physics of Laws, 62 Virginia Lawyer 9, at 30 (2014) (abridged version)

•  The Commonwealth’s Common Law, 40 VBA Journal 26 (Winter 2013-14)

•  The Resurgent Role of Legal History in Modern U.S. Supreme Court Cases, 37 VBA Journal No. 3, at 10 (Fall 2010)

•  The Architecture of Judicial Power: Appellate Review & Stare Decisis, 53 Virginia Lawyer, No. 3 (Oct. 2004); see also 45 The Judges' Journal 2, at 6-13 (ABA 2006)

•  The Laws of Physics and the Physics of Laws, 25 Regent U. L. Rev. 89 (2012)

•  Law & Politics:  The Imperative of Judicial Self-Restraint, 28 VBA Journal No. 6, at 6-9 (Sept. 2002)

•  Procedural Defaults: Balancing Systemic & Individual Justice, 1 VTLA Appellate Journal 1-22 (2012)

•  The Thing Decided:  Rule 1:6’s Rediscovery of Res Judicata in Virginia, 34 VBA Journal No. 2, at 18-21, 26 (June/July 2008)

•  Virginia’s Answer To Daubert’s Question Behind The Question, 90 Judicature No. 2, 68-71 (2006)

•  Procedural Defaults In Virginia Trial Courts:  The Adversarial Model & The Imperative of Neutrality, 55 Virginia Lawyer 3, at 38 (Oct. 2006)

•  Social Compact as Law:  The Workers’ Compensation Act and the Wicked Sisters of the Common Law, 31 VBA Journal No. 5, at 13-21 (Oct./Nov. 2005)

•  Law & Equity in Virginia, 28 VBA Journal No. 8, at 6-10 (Dec. 2002)

•  In Rem Liens & Ship Repair Contracts, Shipping Finance Annual 177-79 (Euromoney PLC 1996)

•  Robert M. Hughes III & D. Arthur Kelsey, Toxic & Environmental Torts Within Admiralty, 62 Tul. L. Rev. 405 (1988)

•  D. Arthur Kelsey & John E. Holloway, Mistaken LHWCA Compensation Payments:  Subrogation Lien Or Third Party Credit?, 30 J. Mar. L. & Com. 19 (1999)

•  Wendy Cohen & D. Arthur Kelsey, The Virginia Lawyer (Lexis L. Pub.), Chp. 3 (1998)

•  Contributing Author, ABA Section of Antitrust Law, Antitrust Law Developments (4th ed. 1997 & Supp. 1998)

•  Associate Editor, American Maritime Cases (Mar. L. Ass’n) (1999-2000)

References

1961 births
Living people
College of William & Mary alumni
Judges of the Court of Appeals of Virginia
Old Dominion University alumni
Politicians from Suffolk, Virginia
Justices of the Supreme Court of Virginia
21st-century American judges